Brazatortas is a municipality in Ciudad Real, Castile-La Mancha, Spain. It has a population of 1,200.

In 1950 it had a population of 1,669.

Municipalities in the Province of Ciudad Real